Kelland is a surname. Notable people with the surname include:

Clarence Budington Kelland (1881-1964), American author
Gilbert Kelland (1924-1997), British police officer and Freemason
John Kelland
Peter Kelland (1926–2011), English cricketer
Philip Kelland (1808–1879), English mathematician
Eve Louise Kelland (1889–1943), Australian actress and singer